River Cottage: Gone Fishing is a Channel 4 programme that follows Hugh Fearnley-Whittingstall as he explores more sustainable fishing methods in the Channel Islands, Scotland and back in the West Country. Fearnley-Whittingstall's aim was to get people to eat greater varieties of fish and shellfish.

List of episodes

References

External links
 

Channel 4 original programming
2007 British television series debuts
2007 British television series endings